Valery Gorbachik (born 19 January 1995) is a Belarusian professional footballer who plays for Torpedo-BelAZ Zhodino.

Honours
Liepāja
Latvian Football Cup winner: 2020

References

External links 
 
 

1995 births
Living people
People from Marjina Horka
Sportspeople from Minsk Region
Belarusian footballers
Association football forwards
Belarusian expatriate footballers
Expatriate footballers in Latvia
FC Dinamo Minsk players
FC Bereza-2010 players
FC Smolevichi players
FC Torpedo-BelAZ Zhodino players
FK Liepāja players
FC Isloch Minsk Raion players